HaYehudim or I.U.D.M (lit. The Jews) is an Israeli hard rock band, formed in 1992 by (now married) couple Tom Petrover and Orit Shahaf, who share guitar playing and vocal duties. The band has achieved tremendous success in Israel despite relative commercial disregard in its first years, and has sold over 200,000 albums in Israel.

The band is known for its energetic, dark-themed songs and loud vocals. The band sings mostly in Hebrew, although in later albums they have several songs in English.

History
The band's first album, Metziut Nifredet (Separate Reality) was released in 1995 through Hed Arzi Music. Several music videos from the album were often played on Israeli television, but not on the radio and initially the album sold poorly. However the band continued playing live shows all over Israel, gaining a cult following. The debut album went gold in 1998, and later on achieved double platinum.

The second album, self-titled HaYehudim and released in 1998, and was an immediate success despite continuing disregard from mainstream media, making HaYehudim one of the leading rock bands in Israel. This album, too, attained gold status.

In 1999 Hayehudim were elected as Band of the Year on Galey Tzahal, Israel's national radio station. The same year, they opened the Metallica concert in Israel, and in 2000 the band opened the Rage Against the Machine concert in Israel as well.

Four years after their second album, Hayehudim released a third studio album by the name of Pahad Mavet (Fear of Death) in 2002. The next year Hayehudim released their first live album - a double CD and DVD set named Hayhudim LIVE. The live album was a great success and the following year the band released a second live album, this time of an unplugged show.

In 2007 Hayehudim released their fourth studio album, Forte. In musicology, the term forte means loud or strong, and the name was chosen because if you hadn't had enough of Hayehudim till now, you're about to get Hayehudim forte (meaning Hayehudim extra-strong, as Tom Petrover explained in a radio interview). The album went gold, and won Album of the Year in the Israeli Music Channel awards.

In 2015 the band released their latest album Yoter Lo (No More).

Name
The name 'HaYehudim', literally meaning The Jews, was proposed to the band by Eldad Ziv, an Israeli theatre director and musician, and by Roy Zu-Arets, the music producer who produced the band's debut album Metziut Nifredet. Despite being a provocative name the band's members liked it and decided to use it.

In Relation To Historical Events 
All of the band's albums came out in times of instability in Israel, which was reflected in the dark and heavy music and lyrics. Their debut album Metziut Nifredet came out just a few months before Yitzhak Rabin's assassination, in August of 1995, while the political discourse in Israel was heavily polarized regarding The Oslo Accords. The following self-titled album came out in 1998. The late 90's in Israel saw many major terror attacks and fear was rampant in day-to-day life. Their 3rd albun, Pahad Mavet, released in 2002, during the second Intifada (just after Operation Defensive Shield) when the Israeli Defence Forces faced many casualties in attempt to quell uprisings in the West Bank. The 4th album Forte came out in 2007, following The second Lebanon War and the next album Yoter Lo was released and even delayed due to Operation Protective Edge. Both of which had the army entering southern Lebanon and the Gaza Strip respectively in response to attacks and terror activities carried out from these regions.

Members
Current members
Tom Petrover - guitar, vocals
Orit Shachaf - lead vocals, backing guitar
Yahav Lipinski - drums
Zak Soulam - guitar
Greg Pearl - bass
Eran Mitleman - keyboards

Former members
Avi Yifrach - bass
Smulik Bogdov - guitar
Asher Pedi - drums
Elad Keren - bass
Yiftach Shachaf - guitar
Eitan Veksler - guitar
Avi Strool - bass
Roy Zu-Arets - keyboards
Daniel Brecher - guitar
Adam Peri - keyboards
Guy Be’er - guitar

Discography

Studio albums
Metziut Nifredet ("Separate Reality") - 1995
HaYehudim - 1998
Pakhad Mavet ("Fear of Death") - 2002
Forte - 2007
Yoter Lo ("No More") - 2015

Live albums
HaYehudim LIVE (Live CD and DVD) - 2003
HaYehudim Unplugged (An unplugged concert) - 2004

References

External links
 Official website
 HaYehudim on Myspace
 HaYehudim on Facebook

Musical groups established in 1992
Musical groups from Tel Aviv
Israeli rock music groups